Deh-e Reza (also Romanized as Deh-e Reẕā) is a village in Rigan Rural District, in the Central District of Rigan County, Kerman Province, Iran. At the 2006 census, its population was 229, in 58 families.
The people of Dehreza village are of two races,Baloch and Farsi.The village of Dehreza was created by person named Reza Khan Khajehnezam during the Qajar period.Reza Khan had many children from his wives,among whom Yaghi Khan Khajehnezam is the most famous.Sardar Yaghi Khan Khajehnezam was one of the fighters against the oppression and tyranny of the local rulers in his time.The sons of Yaghi Khan like their father stepped on the path of fighting the foreign invasion and the freedom of the country.Yaghi Khan had many children but his sons who where among the fighters of the constitutional revolution,are more famous . Yaghi Khan sonś are Gholamreza Khan,Gholamhossein Khan, Mohammadhassan Khan and Akbar Khan.khajehnezamś brothers were among the fighters of the constitutional revolution and members of the Kerman Democratic Party.Together with Rafaatnezam the leader of the constitutional, movement in the south of Kerman,they rebelled against the central government,but it was not long before they were suppressed by the treachery and conspiracy of their own forces and the cunning of the enemy of the revolution and Rafaatnezam was arrested and executed along with a number of his comrades.The people of Dehreza were among the pioneers of the constitutional revolution in the south of Kerman.Dehreza village has historical castle,most of which was destroyed due to sandstorms.

References 

Populated places in Rigan County